Song Islands vol. 2 (Collected Rarities and Singles) is a compilation album by Mount Eerie. It was released on October 19, 2010. It is a sequel to the Microphones album Song Islands.

Recording and release
The recording took place from 2002-2009 in the Dub Narcotic Studio in Olympia, Washington. The album consists of B-sides, rarities and never before released songs from the Microphones and Mount Eerie. Every song on the album was re-mixed and remastered. A 32-page booklet was released alongside the album.

Music
The album incorporates elements of smooth jazz and punk.  An official press release described the sound on the album as "Raw poems barely accompanied on acoustic guitar, expanses of wooden percussion, distorted punk instructionals, hundreds of voices singing, an attempt at smooth jazz, the lowest note on a questionable piano in a big empty".

Track 13 features a rendition of "Voice in Headphones" by Elverum's band Singers, who featured on the 2005 album Singers.

Reception

The album received mixed reviews upon release. Paul Thompson of Pitchfork wrote that "Elverum's always at his best when the songs feel sewn into their surroundings; the songs from Song Islands 2 seem plucked piecemeal from the archives, divorced from the bursts of inspiration that birthed them". Alex Young of Consequence of Sound wrote that "Song Islands Vol. 2 hits incredible highs and lows even the most dedicated fan would question" but conceded that it was "on the whole, a worthy investment of time and thought". Nick Rs of Tiny Mix Tapes wrote that "The songs here, culled from eight years of output, present stylistic contrasts even starker than on any previous Microphones/Mount Eerie release". He gave particular praise to the song "Where Is My Tarp?" writing that it "overshadows practically everything around it".

Track listing

Personnel
Phil Elverum – songwriting, vocals

Production
John Golden – re-mixing and remastering

References

2010 albums
Mount Eerie albums